FP is a cubic-grain black-and-white film from Ilford Photo with a long history. It originated as Fine grain Panchromatic roll film in 1935. Like its faster partner product, HP film, it has gone through a number of versions since then, with the latest being FP4 plus (FP4+ for short).

The film is known for being versatile, with usable results even when underexposed two stops or overexposed six stops. This is due to the fact that FP4 features a double layer emulsion. It combines a low sensitive fine grain layer and a highly sensitive layer with larger grains. This kind of film was already known in the 1920s and 1930s (e.g. Agfa Isopan F 17/10° DIN). Being perfect for the amateur's 6x9 roll film cameras these old types lacked sharpness in the 24 x 36 mm format due to the overall thickness of both layers. But the FP4 of 1968 combined an amateur-friendly double layer emulsion with the sharpness of a typical thin layer emulsion. This was possible because both layers together were only 7.5 µm thick.

References

External links 
 Ilford FP4 plus

Photographic films